Xiphidiata is a suborder of Plagiorchiida, an order of parasitic flatworms (flukes).

The following superfamilies are in the suborder Xiphidiata:

 Allocreadioidea Looss, 1902
 Gorgoderoidea Looss, 1901
 Haploporoidea Nicoll, 1914
 Microphalloidea Ward, 1901
 Plagiorchioidea Lühe, 1901
 Troglotrematoidea Odhner, 1914

The genus Zdzitowieckitrema, with the single species Zdzitowieckitrema incognitum, described by Sokolov, Lebedeva, Gordeev, & Khasanov in 2017, is yet unplaced within the suborder Xiphidiata.

References

Protostome suborders
Plagiorchiida